Lyall Brooks (born 16 November 1978) is an Australian actor who has appeared on TV, film and stage. Establishing a reputation early in his career as an Actor with great comic timing, Brooks has recently received industry praise for more dramatic roles, particularly on stage. He has studied under Emmy Award-winner Chick Vennera at Renegade Players Los Angeles and is also experienced in dance, having studied under one of Australia's most popular choreographers, Tony Bartuccio.

Television
Brooks began his television career in 2005 with a guest role as Glenn Hart on Blue Heelers followed by Ten Network's British/Australian six-part drama series Tripping Over where he played an assistant director opposite Daniel MacPherson.  His first major television break was landing a role as a co-host of The Mint in 2007, an Australian phone-in quiz show based on the British program of the same name, and broadcast on the Nine Network.  When the show was axed in 2008 Brooks went back to Ten Network to play the role of footy coach Nathan Black in Neighbours, appearing in 11 episodes during 2008 and 2009.

The beginning of 2011 saw Brooks land the role as resident sketch performer on the comedy and variety show Ben Elton Live from Planet Earth which aired on the Nine Network but was cancelled after three shows. He returned to the silver screen in 2012 with guest roles in the ABC 1 comedy series Rake and You're Skitting Me for ABC3. In 2012 Brooks appeared in the 6 part comedy series The Delightfully Shit World of Lachlan and Hayden for Channel 31, where he was also a resident writer.

In February 2013 Brooks landed a guest role in the second series of "Miss Fisher's Murder Mysteries" as Father Blackburn.

Film
In 2007 Brooks appeared in the short film Alex & Alexa for director Rhett Dashwood, which was an official selection in the St Kilda Film Festival. He followed this up with It's Awkward, a short film by Lachdown Productions where he played the lead hero and which became runner up at the 2011 Julia Morris Film Festival. Brooks also appeared as the Brand Manager for the feature film Any Questions for Ben? starring Josh Lawson and Rachael Taylor and he is slated to appear as Ron Furick in Shelly Hatton's US/Australian comedy Dirt Cheap, which is expected to shoot in the second half of 2013.

Theatre

Brooks has enjoyed a varied career on stage with a long list of credits in musical theatre including the role of Jakub in Dutch Courage and as Man for The Thing About Men, both produced by Magnormos, Brandy Bottle Bates in Guys and Dolls, Knuckles in Sugar for The Production Company and as Andy in John and Fiona Thorn's musical cabaret hit Kiss of Death, which debuted at the 2011 Melbourne Fringe Festival.

He has also appeared in two works by Michael Dalley, Vaudeville X in 2009 and Urban Display Suite in 2012 for which he received rave reviews and comparisons to Anthony Newley, Rik Mayall and The Office's David Brent.

More recently Brooks has moved into dramatic theatre, making his mainstage debut with the 2012 Melbourne Theatre Company production of Richard Bean's award-winning play, The Heretic. Playing the character of Geoff Tordoff, he received largely positive reviews for his stage presence and being the standout performer.

In June 2012 it was announced Brooks would play the lead role of Philip in the Australian premiere of Alexi Kaye Campbell's Laurence Olivier Award-winning play The Pride. Directed by Gary Abrahams for Red Stitch Actors Theatre, Brooks received positive reviews ranging from "terrifically brave and nuanced" to displaying "impeccable comic timing and delivery and also a firm grasp of the dramatic". Brooks was rewarded for his efforts with a Green Room Award nomination for Best Ensemble alongside fellow cast members Ben Geurens, Ngaire Dawn Fair and Ben Prendergast.

In March 2013 Brooks teamed up with Red Stitch Actors Theatre again, to play the lead role of Quinn in their production of Penelope by Enda Walsh. His performance in this (otherwise mixed-reviewed) production was  described as "the perfect Alpha male. Brooks nails it on every level, and when the play has him resorting to burlesque... he's also very funny. He impresses in everything he does, and Penelope is no exception."

Brooks has reportedly committed to more mainstage roles for 2013 including Patricia Cornelius' new play Savages for fortyfivedownstairs, Sunday in the Park with George for [www.victorianopera.com.au/ Victorian Opera] and as lead Tom in Neil LaBute's Fat Pig for Lab Kelpie.

Voiceover

Since 2009 Brooks has worked with Moody Street Productions on several animations series where he has provided lead characters for Sumo Mouse (2010), Flea-Bitten! (2012) and SheZow (2013), which premiered in the US on The Hub network. He voiced characters for the Galaxy Pop series, Get Ace.

Awards and nominations

Green Room Awards
 2012: Nominated — Theatre (Companies): Best Ensemble (for The Pride)
 2008: Nominated — Music Theatre: Male Artist In A Featured Role (as "Man" for The Thing About Men)

Filmography

References

External links
 Official Website
 
 Official Twitter

1978 births
Living people
Male actors from Melbourne
Australian male film actors
Australian male television actors